Jack Owens may refer to:

Jack Owens (blues singer) (1904–1997), American Delta blues singer and guitarist
Jack Owens (footballer) (1902–1942), Australian rules footballer who played for Glenelg during the 1920s and 1930s
Jack Owens (singer-songwriter) (1912–1982), American singer/songwriter, pianist, known as "The Cruising Crooner"
Jack Owens (baseball) (1908–1958), American baseball player
Jack Owens (rugby league) (born 1994), rugby league player
Jack Owens (basketball) (born 1977), basketball coach
Jack Owens (rugby union) (born 1995), Irish rugby player

See also
John Owens (disambiguation)
Jack Owen (disambiguation)